Montrose is a historic farmhouse located near McKenney, Dinwiddie County, Virginia. The original section was built about 1828, and is a -story, three-bay, frame structure with a center-hall plan.  It has been enlarged at least twice to become "L"-shaped in plan. It features a double-shouldered end chimneys of stone with brick stacks.  The interior has Federal style woodwork. It was the birthplace of the  Confederate General Roger Atkinson Pryor and long the home of the locally prominent Baskerville family.

It was listed on the National Register of Historic Places in 2004.

References

Houses on the National Register of Historic Places in Virginia
National Register of Historic Places in Dinwiddie County, Virginia
Federal architecture in Virginia
Houses completed in 1828
Houses in Dinwiddie County, Virginia